Stonebridge Park may refer to:

Stonebridge Park, Liverpool, a new business centre in Liverpool
Stonebridge Park Depot, Brent, London
Stonebridge Park, London, a major junction in North-West London
Stonebridge Park station, a tube station in Tokyngton, London